Megaderus is a genus of long-horned beetles in the family Cerambycidae. There are at least two described species in Megaderus.

Species
These two species belong to the genus Megaderus:
 Megaderus bifasciatus (Dupont, 1836) — Found in North America and Central America
 Megaderus stigma (Linnaeus, 1758) — Found in South America and Central America

References

Further reading

 
 

Trachyderini
Articles created by Qbugbot